The Sunday Football League Western Australia (SFL WA), commonly known as the Sunday Football League (SFL), is a defunct semi-professional Australian rules football league that was based in the southern suburbs of Perth, Western Australia. The League was in operation from 1984 to 2008, and Kenwick Royals was the most successful club with eight senior team premierships.

History 

The Sunday Football League (SFL) was formed in late 1983 after a proposed merger between the South Suburban Murray Football League (SSMFL) and Western Australian Football Association  (WAFA) fell through.  The twelve SSMFL clubs were Armadale, Canning, Gosnells, Kalamunda, Kelmscott, Kenwick, Kwinana, Maddington, Mandurah, Rockingham, Thornlie and Willetton. The five WAFA clubs to join were Applecross, Fremantle (later North Fremantle), Osborne Park, South Perth and Wanneroo.  Six WAFA clubs decided to stay in that competition rather than join the new league.

South Suburban Football 
Prior to the Sunday Football League being formed, the South Suburban Murray Football League was formed in 1960 when two leagues - the South Suburban Football Association and Murray Districts Football Association - agreed to a trial season. The SSFA had only five teams competing in 1959 (Armadale, Canning, Gosnells, Kelmscott and Maddington) while the MDFA had four teams (Hills, Pinjarra, Mandurah and Waroona). Kenwick, who had been trying since 1958 to join the SSFA, was accepted as the tenth team to remove a bye in each round.

The South Suburban Football Association began in 1910 with three teams, Armadale, Kelmscott and Mundijong. Queens Park joined in 1911, while Mundijong withdrew after five games. Victoria Park joined the SSFA in 1913. Queens Park won the premiership in 1913 after taking the SSFA to court after the league decided to change how the premier team would be selected that year.

The Murray Districts Football Association started in 1938 with five teams (Coolup, Mandurah, North Dandalup, Pinjarra and Waroona). Pinjarra won the first premiership, and Waroona won the next two before the competition was suspended due to World War 2. Waroona won the first two flags after the competition resumed in 1946 and 47. Pinjarra won in 1948 and Mandurah won their first premiership in 1949.

West Australian Football Association 
The West Australian Football Association (WAFA) was established in 1949 as the Mercantile Football Association (MFA).  The MFA consisted primarily of work-based clubs such as Boans, Daily News, Foys, Hardies, Mails, Sunday Times, Wesfarmers and Telegraphs.  In 1954, the league was renamed as the Sunday National Football League (SNFL) and there were separate A-Grade and B-Grade competitions with promotion and relegation.  The more traditional suburban-based teams were introduced in the 1950s, such as Maylands, Scarborough (not related to the current Club of the same name), Rockingham and Osborne Park.  Work-based teams also changed names, with Wesfarmers becoming North Perth, Tramways becoming Leederville, and Sunday Times becoming Metropolitans.

In the 1960s, the league expanded with the inclusion of clubs from Wanneroo, Midland, Belmont, Cockburn, Bayswater and East Fremantle.  By 1964, a Reserves Grade replaced the B-Grade competition, and each Club was required to field two sides.  The league also changed name to the West Australian Football Association (WAFA) in 1968.  South Perth, Applecross and Mosman Park were introduced in the 1970s.  In 1980, the WAFA absorbed six teams from the disbanded Fremantle Ex-Scholars Football Association and a Division 2 was created.  The WAFA reverted to a single grade competition in 1984 after Applecross, Fremantle (later North Fremantle), Osborne Park, South Perth and Wanneroo left to join the Sunday Football League.

The final year of the WAFA was in 1987 with teams from Manning, Mosman Park, Midland, Cockburn, Belmont and Tuart Hill.  Over its 39 years, a total of 49 different clubs competed in the WAFA.

Lower SFL Grades 
Between 1988 and 1991, the SFL managed a second-tier competition (with League, Reserves and Colts grades) known as the Metropolitan Football League (MFL).  The MFL initially consisted of six teams, including four teams from the disbanded WAFA - Manning, Mosman Park, Midland and Cockburn - plus Fremantle and Kwinana, who previously competed in the top division of the Sunday Football League.  Pinjarra and Mundijong Centrals joined in 1989 after the Murray Districts Football League disbanded, and were joined in 1990 by Waroona and South Mandurah.  At the end of 1991, teams from the MFL joined the newly formed Peel Football League.

Between 1994 and 1997, the SFL managed another second-tier competition (with League, Reserves and Colts grades), known initially as the Sunday Amateurs Football League (SAFL).  The  SAFL initially consisted of seven teams, including Belmont, Midland, Kingsley, Cockburn, Manning, Mosman Park and North Fremantle.  A number of these teams had joined after previously competing in the Peel Football League.  Kalamunda and Ballajura joined the SAFL in 1995, replacing Cockburn and Manning.  In 1997, the League was re-badged as the Sunday Football League (SFL) Division 2, and was reduced to four teams, after Belmont, Midland and North Fremantle left.  Belmont joined the SFL at that time.

Between 1985 and 2008, the SFL managed a single-grade, third-tier competition, known initially as the SFL Saturday Amateurs Division.  The Saturday Amateurs Division included the Thirds teams from those Division 1 clubs that had sufficient players to do so.  The grade was renamed the SFL Division 3 from 1994 to 1997, but returned to the SFL Saturday Amateurs Division from 1998 to 2003.  In 2004, there was revamp of the grade to include other single-team clubs, and there was a renaming to the West Australian Football Association (WAFA), which was a tribute to the former WAFA that existed between 1949 and 1987.

Disbanding 
In February 2009 it was announced that the league would not be operating for the 2009 football season with clubs applying to join the Western Australian Amateur Football League and the Peel Football League.

Armadale were admitted to the Peel Football League and the remaining clubs were admitted to the West Australian Amateur Football League.

It was an unfortunate event that clubs which had high public profiles in the SFL largely faded from public view when they were thrust into the lower-leagues of the Amateurs.

Clubs

SFL Division 1

Metropolitan Football League

Sunday Amateurs FL / SFL Division 2

Saturday Amateurs Division / SFL Division 3 / WAFA

Grand final results

League grades

SFL Division 1 - League 

Note: Results source from Sunday Football League Yearbooks

Metropolitan Football League - League

Sunday Amateurs Football League / SFL Division 2 - League 

Note: Known as Sunday Amateur Football League (SAFL) from 1994 to 1996 and Sunday Football League (SFL) Division 2 in 1997

Reserves grades

SFL Division 1 - Reserves

Metropolitan Football League - Reserves

Sunday Amateurs Football League / SFL Division 2 - Reserves

Lower grades

SFL Saturday Amateurs Division / SFL Division 3 

Note: Known as SFL Saturday Amateurs Division from 1985 to 1993, SFL Division 3 from 1994 to 1997, SFL Saturday Amateurs Division from 1998 to 2003 and WAFA from 2004 to 2008

Colts grades

SFL Division 1 - Colts

Metropolitan Football League - Colts

Sunday Amateurs Football League / SFL Division 2 - Colts

Premierships from previous leagues

South Suburban Football Association (SSFA)

South Suburban Murray Football League (SSMFL)

Ladders

2007 ladder

2008 ladder

References

External links 
 

Australian rules football competitions in Western Australia
Sports leagues established in 1984